Qara or  Kara is a Syrian city in the An-Nabek District of the Rif Dimashq Governorate. According to the Syria Central Bureau of Statistics (CBS), Qara had a population of 12,508 in the 2004 census. Its inhabitants are mostly Sunni Muslims and Greek Orthodox and Catholic Christians.

History
It was the southernmost town in the Jund Hims military district of Greater Syria during the Umayyad Caliphate. Abu'l-Fida described it in his Geography of 1321 as "a large village half way between Damascus and Homs. It is a waystation for the caravans.  Most of its inhabitants are Christians. It lies 1½ marches from Homs and 2 marches from Damascus." Since the 14th century Qara has been eclipsed by an-Nabek its neighbor to the south.

The Sufi scholar Abd al-Ghani al-Nabulsi visited Qara in 1690, remarking that the village's houses were "very small", confusing this along with the encountered unfriendliness of the inhabitants as a sign of hostility to outsiders. However, the conditions of Qara were common in villages located in the lawless regions of the Levant at that time. While Qara's population had originally been Christian, by the 17th century it was a mixed Muslim-Christian village.

See also
Monastery of Saint James the Mutilated (Qara)

References

Bibliography

External links
"Photograph of Qara street" Flickr.com

Populated places in An-Nabek District
Cities in Syria
Eastern Orthodox Christian communities in Syria